Delta Sculptoris (δ Scl, δ Sculptoris) is a triple star system in the constellation Sculptor.  It is approximately 137.4 light years from Earth.

The primary component, Delta Sculptoris A, is a white A-type main sequence dwarf with an apparent magnitude of +4.59.  It has a faint, 11.6 magnitude companion, Delta Sculptoris B, 4 arcseconds, or more than 175 astronomical units, away from it.  Orbiting this pair at the much greater separation of 74 arcseconds, is the yellow G-type Delta Sculptoris C, which has an apparent magnitude of +9.4.

This system is a candidate member of the AB Doradus moving group, an association of stars with similar ages that share a common heading through space.

References

Sculptor (constellation)
A-type main-sequence stars
G-type stars
Lambda Boötis stars
Triple star systems
Sculptoris, Delta
CD-28 18353
117452
9016
223352